Balliawal is a village located in the Ludhiana East tehsil, of Ludhiana district, Punjab.

It is administered by a Sarpanch, and elected representative for the village under the constitution of India and Panchayati raj. There are 379 houses in the village, supporting a population of 2,000.

Children aged less than 6 comprise around 15% of the total population. 71.22% of the population are members of Scheduled Castes. According to census data there are no members of Scheduled Tribes in Balliawal.

Villages in Ludhiana East Tehsil

External links
  Villages in Ludhiana East Tehsil

References

Villages in Ludhiana East tehsil